Masami Iwaki (born 29 August 1976) is a Japanese sports shooter. She competed in the women's 10 metre air rifle event at the 1996 Summer Olympics.

References

1976 births
Living people
Japanese female sport shooters
Olympic shooters of Japan
Shooters at the 1996 Summer Olympics
Place of birth missing (living people)
20th-century Japanese women